The Waller Gunnery Trainer was a simulator for training World War II aerial gunners using multiple film projectors. Its inventor, Fred Waller, later invented the Cinerama film format.

See also
 First Motion Picture Unit

References 

Flight training
Projectors